Shaulan (also spelled Saulan) is a  village in the Daspur I CD block in the Ghatal subdivision of the Paschim Medinipur district in the state of West Bengal, India.

Geography                           

Demographics
According to the 2011 Census of India, Shaulan had a total population of 964, of which 469 (49%) were males and 495 (51%) were females. There were 117 persons in the age range of 0–6 years. The total number of literate persons in Shaulan was 702 (82.88% of the population over 6 years).

Culture
David J. McCutchion mentions the Shyama Sundara temple as a standard West Bengal type pancha-ratna having figures in the archway panels and round the facade. Built in the 19th century, it measures 17’ 10” square.

Shaulan picture gallery

References

External links

Villages in Paschim Medinipur district